Mordvinov (masculine), or Mordvinova (Мордвинова, female), is a common surname in Russia. It is derived from Mordvin people. Notable Mordvinovs in history:

 Mordvinov dynasty of Russian nobility (coat of arms):
 Semyon Mordvinov (1701–1777), admiral
 his son: Nikolay Mordvinov (1754–1845), admiral and statesman
 his son: Alexander Mordvinov (1800–1858), amateur painter
 Ivan Mordvinov (d.1816), general, killed in a duel by Pavel Kiselyov
 Arkady Mordvinov (1896–1964), architect
 Nikolay Mordvinov (actor) (1901–1966)